Craig Considine (born 1985) is an Irish-Italian American author, scholar of Islam, and a faculty member of the Department of Sociology at Rice University. He also has experience in filmmaking, having directed the documentary film Journey into America. Considine has written multiple works for the field of Islamic studies, and is recognized as an authority in interfaith dialogue and Christian-Muslim relations. He is a Roman Catholic.

Life and career

Birth and family 
Craig Considine was born in 1985 and spent his childhood in Needham, Massachusetts. He is of Irish and Italian descent. As a college student, he wanted to study Arabic and become an intelligence agent, so that he could spy on ‘bad’ Muslims. At the time, he had never even met a Muslim, and admitted to having fallen into the ‘Islamophobia trap.’
In his youth, Considine attended the Catholic school Saint Bartholomew's Church and the Needham Public Schools system. In 2001, Considine first experienced discrimination against the Muslim community. On the day the World Trade Center was hit, his class was told that it was a terrorist attack. And on the days following this event, Considine overheard his schoolmates saying, ‘Down with Muslims.’ According to him, this was not something he could stand by.

Education and professional career 
After graduating from Needham High School in 2003, Considine attended American University, where he pursued a Bachelor of Arts in International relations. As an undergraduate student, he worked closely under Professor Akbar Ahmed, the Ibn Khaldun Chair of Islamic Studies in the School of International Service. According to Considine, his relationship with his professor helped him see the Muslim community through a different lens. It helped him shift his mindset. Ahmed also viewed Considine as one of his best students. Later, the two would collaborate on the Journey into America documentary film.

Considine moved to London after finishing his undergraduate degree. There, he studied for a master's in science in International Relations at the Royal Holloway, University of London. He graduated in 2008, then joined Ahmed to work on the documentary.

In 2011, Considine entered Trinity College Dublin to pursue a PhD in the Department of Sociology. While undertaking his PhD research, Considine also took on the role of Editor for the Trinity College Dublin Journal of Postgraduate Research. He oversaw the creation of Volume 11, entitled Ireland's Research on the World Stage. Along with this, he worked on his PhD thesis, which focused on the experiences of young Pakistani men in Dublin and Boston. The manuscript was accepted and published in 2014. Considine graduated in 2015.
After finishing his PhD, Considine moved to Houston, where he took a job as a lecturer in Rice University's Department of Sociology and continues to teach. His classes focus on self-directed learning and experiential learning. In previous years, Considine provided no assigned readings nor lectures during his class sessions. Instead, he invited guest speakers to share their expertise and encouraged students to ask their own questions. Later in 2020, he gained distinction as an educator when he received the Sarah A. Burnett Teaching Prize in the Social Sciences from Rice University.

Journey into America (documentary) 
In 2008, after acquiring his master's degree, Considine partnered with his former professor, Akbar Ahmed to create Journey into America. The documentary follows Akbar Ahmed and a group of young researchers as they document the Muslim experience in America. It also features notable figures, such as Noam Chomsky, former Secretary of Homeland Security Michael Chertoff, and Reverend Jesse Jackson.

When Considine asked his professor about the project, Ahmed replied that it lacked a sufficient budget for him to come on. To join Ahmed in his research project, Considine sent his resume to around 60 organizations. In the end, he received the funding he needed from Dar Al Islam, an institution in New Mexico that seeks to promote the education of Islam in America.

With the grant, Considine was able to join Ahmed on his journey across the United States. He filmed Ahmed's group as they interviewed American citizens across 75 different cities and 100 mosques. Considine also took charge of editing and processing the film. Later, his footage was used by popular news channels, such as BBC World News America and CNN.

At one point, Considine and the rest of the team conducted a social experiment in Arab, Alabama. They dressed one of their female team members in a full abaya, and gauged onlookers’ reactions. To their surprise, the people of Arab were kind and accommodating of their female teammate. Throughout their travels, they reported experiencing warmth and hospitality from locals of different cities.

Throughout the many interviews conducted by Ahmed and his team, they found that some people thought that Muslims could not be Americans. Conversely, they also interviewed American Muslims who were proud to be citizens of the United States. Considine was very much involved in the entire process. He hoped that the film would help bridge the relationship between American Muslims and the rest of the country. According to Considine, people of varying faiths need to be understood.

Journey into America premiered at the Islamic Society of North America conference in Washington, D.C. on July 4, 2009. The documentary was produced and narrated by Ahmed and directed by Considine. Ahmed also wrote a book on his experiences entitled Journey into America: The Challenge of Islam. Both the documentary and the book are a follow-up to a different study conducted by Ahmed. It was entitled ‘Journey into Islam’ and followed the same researchers as they traveled across Muslim countries. The research study also sprouted a documentary and a book.
The documentary garnered praise for the team's dedication to their research. Ahmed's work has cemented him as a contemporary cultural anthropologist. With Considine's help, he was able to document the operation and distribute the finished material.

Islam, Race, and Pluralism in the Pakistani Diaspora 
Considine's first book was published in 2017. It tackled what he referred to as ‘Pakphobia’ or the aversion to Pakistan in the Irish and American context. To gather information for the book, Considine met with over 40 people. He engaged them in interviews and held focus groups to build his book. Through his research, he found that Pakphobia in the Irish and American context stemmed from how the individuals viewed Pakistanis as Muslims. This then taps into a perceived threat of Muslims and radical Islam. Considine garnered praise for the book's accessibility. Reviewers laud the text for being easy to understand for both academics and laypeople. Considine is also praised for putting together a vast selection of anecdotes from Pakistanis of varying ages and backgrounds.

Muslims in America: Examining the Facts 
For his second book, Considine sought to document the real lives, actions, and beliefs of American Muslims. According to him, he wanted to bring the community's voices and actions to light. The book answers 31 different questions relating to Muslims in American society. Throughout the text, Considine disproves widely believed myths. In one part of the book, he writes that Muslims condemn the violent actions of extremists. He also delves into how the Muslim community contributes to interfaith dialogue.

The Humanity of Muhammad: A Christian View 
Considine's latest book examines the life and influence of Prophet Muhammad. Considine believes him to be misunderstood and writes about this with his Christian background in mind. The mix of a Christian perspective with Islamic beliefs draws out the possibility that Islamic Theology can be appreciated by non-Muslim individuals. In the book, Considine delves into Muhammad's views on race, stating that he was not merely ‘non-racist,’ but anti-racist. He also talks about religious tolerance and how it is not always enough in the context of religious pluralism. Later, Considine introduces the concept of a ‘civil nation state,’ which is a community that transcends ethnic, tribal and religious boundaries. In such a community, people from diverse backgrounds can live under one government and one creator – God.

Works

Books 

 Islam, Race, and Pluralism in the Pakistani Diaspora. 2017. Routledge. ISBN 978-1-315-46275-2.
 Muslims in America: Examining the Facts. 2018. ABC-Clio. ISBN 978-1-4408-6054-6.
 Islam in America: Exploring the Issues. 2019. ABC-Clio. ISBN 978-1-4408-6631-9.
 The Humanity of Muhammad: A Christian View. 2020. Blue Dome Press. ISBN 978-1-68206-529-7.
 People of the Book: Prophet Muhammad’s Encounters with Christians. 2021. Hurst Publishers. ISBN 978-1-78738-471-2.

Journal Articles 

 Family, Religion, and Identity in the Pakistani Diaspora: A Case Study of Young Pakistani Men in Dublin and Boston (PhD Thesis). 2014. Trinity College Dublin.
 Religious Pluralism and Civic Rights in a “Muslim Nation”: An Analysis of Prophet Muhammad’s Covenants with Christians. 2016. MDPI.
 The Racialization of Islam in the United States: Islamophobia, Hate Crimes, and “Flying while Brown”. 2017. MDPI.

Other Media 

 Journey Into America. 2009 (documentary).
 What Prophet Muhammad’s covenants with Christians say about IS. 2016. Middle East Eye. 
 Prophet Muhammad stood for humanity in Medina, while IS tries to destroy it. June 3, 2016. Middle East Eye. 
 The Rohingya Are the New Palestinians. September 26, 2017. Foreign Policy. 
 Muslims in America: Separating fact from fiction. August 14, 2018. Daily Sabah.
 Notre Dame and Al-Aqsa Fires Give Christians and Muslims a Chance to Work Together to Repair Their Sacred Spaces. April 16, 2019. Newsweek. 
 The Sri Lanka Church Bombings Are the Opposite of What Prophet Muhammad Intended. April 23, 2019. Newsweek. 
 Can the Power of Prayer Alone Stop a Pandemic like the Coronavirus? Even the Prophet Muhammad Thought Otherwise. March 17, 2020. Newsweek.

Other Engagements 
Throughout his professional career, Considine has spoken in multiple academic events. In 2012, he was a guest speaker for an event by SOAS University London that highlighted his work in Journey into America. He was joined by his former professor, Ahmed. Also present were two other scholars in Muslim studies, Dr. Anshuman Mondal and Professor Peter Morey.

Considine was also invited to speak at University of Arkansas, for an event entitled, ‘Prophet Muhammad's Promises to Christians.’ It was sponsored by notable organizations, namely the Al-Islam Students Association, the Humanities Program, the Department of Sociology, the University of Arkansas Honors College, the Middle Eastern Center, and the Religious Studies Program.

Aside from speaking at academic events, Considine has also been a guest on podcasts. He's been invited to Podcast Noor, hosted by Noor Al-Huda, where he talked about the commonalities between Jesus and Muhammad. The episode highlights the interfaith dialogue between Christianity and Islam, saying that the two religious figures would have been friends if they’d met today. Another podcast Considine went on in This Being Human, which is supported by the Aga Khan Museum. In that podcast, he also delves into his interest in interfaith dialogue. He highlights his belief that Christianity and Islam are not very different in essence, and pushes for the importance of interfaith cooperation, tolerance, understanding, and convergence.
Considine has also made multiple appearances on news outlets to speak on current events regarding Islamophobia and other extremist acts related to religion. He's appeared on TRT World Now, an English-speaking Turkish public broadcaster news channel. There, he talked about the Christchurch mosque shootings and how this affected the public opinion on the Muslim community. In the interview, he highlighted how terrorism was an act not exclusive to a specific community, and spoke up against politicians who leveraged public ignorance to incite religious-based discrimination. Considine has also been a guest in other international interviews, primarily in Al Jazeera features.

See also 

 Personal Website.
Dr. Craig Considine. LinkedIn profile.
Craig M. Considine. Rice University, faculty profile.
Dr. Craig Considine. Routledge, author profile.

References

1985 births
Living people
American Islamic studies scholars
American male film actors
American people of Irish descent
American people of Italian descent
American Roman Catholic religious writers
Christian and Islamic interfaith dialogue
Christian scholars of Islam
People from Needham, Massachusetts
People in interfaith dialogue
Rice University faculty